St Nicholas Olave was a church in the City of London, on the west side of Bread Street Hill in Queenhithe Ward. It was destroyed in the Great Fire of London and was never rebuilt. Instead the parish  was united with that of St Nicholas Cole Abbey.

History
The dedication of the church derives from the earlier amalgamation between two parishes: St Nicholas and St Olave Bradestrat, which was removed by the Austin Friars for the erection of their monastic buildings. Described by John Stow as a “convenient church” the parish had strong connections with the Worshipful Company of Fishmongers, many members of which were buried in the churchyard. Its eminent organist William Blitheman also lay here. Following the fire the parish was united with that of St Nicholas Cole Abbey Some parish records survive.

The site is currently occupied by Senator House.

References

External links

11th-century church buildings in England
1666 disestablishments in England
Churches destroyed in the Great Fire of London and not rebuilt
Churches in the City of London
Former buildings and structures in the City of London